Urangaua subanalis is a species of beetle in the family Cerambycidae. It was described by Zajciw in 1964.

References

Acanthoderini
Beetles described in 1964